Queen Margaret College may refer to:

 Queen Margaret University College, now Queen Margaret University, Edinburgh, United Kingdom
 Queen Margaret College (Glasgow), a former higher education institution in Glasgow, United Kingdom
 Queen Margaret College (Wellington), an independent all-girls high school in Wellington, New Zealand